Carl Hinkson (born 14 April 1997) is a Barbadian footballer who plays as a right-back for the SIUE Cougars.

College career

Played for SIUE Cougars from 2015–2019.

International career
Hinkson represented the Barbados U17s at the 2013 CONCACAF U-17 Championship. Hinkson made his debut for the Barbados national football team in a 0–0 friendly tie with Bermuda on 26 March 2018.

References

External links
 NFT Profile
 SIUE Cougars Profile
 Barbados FA Profile
 Soccerway Profile

1997 births
Living people
People from Saint George, Barbados
Barbadian footballers
Barbados international footballers
Association football fullbacks
SIU Edwardsville Cougars men's soccer players
Barbadian expatriate footballers
Barbadian expatriate sportspeople in the United States
Expatriate soccer players in the United States